Newcastle Aerodrome  is located on Sea Road in Newcastle, a village in County Wicklow (Contae Chill Mhantáin), Ireland. This aerodrome is licensed by the Aeronautical Services Department of the Irish Aviation Authority.

Facilities 

References

Airports in the Republic of Ireland
Transport in County Wicklow